SS Volendam was a  ton ocean liner operated by Holland America Line (Nederlandsch-Amerikaansche Stoomvaart Maatschappij). She was built in 1922 by Harland & Wolff Ltd, in Govan, Glasgow. Her  sister ship TSS Veendam was built by Harland & Wolff the following year. She operated on transatlantic routes between Europe and the USA, sailing the Rotterdam – New York and Rotterdam – Halifax (Nova Scotia) service.

She had two funnels and two masts. Passenger accommodation was divided into three classes and initially configured as: 263 in First class, 436 in Second class and 1,200 in Third class. She was purchased by Holland America Line while under construction, and launched on 6 July 1922. Her maiden voyage started on 4 November 1922 sailing from Rotterdam to New York.

In May 1926 she was refitted to carry First, Second, Tourist and Third class passengers, and by April 1930 changed yet again to carry First, Tourist and Third class. Her last Rotterdam – New York voyage commenced 5 April 1940. Therefore she managed to escape before the Netherlands was overrun and surrendered to the Germans in the May of 1940.

War service
She was among many Allied merchant ships who escaped to Britain rather than be interned in occupied countries in World War II. Together with Holland America Line's  she served in the Allied cause. She was then chartered to the British Ministry of War Transport and put into service. Under the terms of the charter the flag and crew would remain Dutch.

Volendam was assigned to the Children's Overseas Reception Board, a British Government scheme introduced in 1940 to evacuate UK school children overseas.

She sailed from Liverpool on Thursday 29 August 1940 as one of 33 ships in Convoy OB 205. Her Master was Captain J.P. Wepster and she had a crew of 273. She carried 879 passengers: 320 children with their escorts and 286 other passengers. She was also the convoy Commodore ship with Admiral G.H. Knowles aboard.

Captain Wepster then gave the order to abandon ship, and despite rough seas all 18 lifeboats got away safely. It was nighttime and pitch-black. The only person lost was the 51-year-old Dutch purser Rijk Baron, who, as he was climbing down a rope ladder to one of the boats received a blow to the head from a swinging pulley, knocking him unconscious, causing him to fall into the sea and drown. A few weeks later his body washed up on the Scottish islet of Gunna (between the Inner Hebridean islands of Tiree and Coll) and he was buried in a churchyard on Tiree.

The passengers and children were quickly rescued by other merchantmen in the convoy, including the British oil tankers Bassethound, and Valldemosa, the Norwegian cargo ship Olaf Fostenes (which rescued 231 survivors, including 75 children), and S-class destroyer . They were taken to Greenock and other west coast ports in Scotland on 1 September. All 320 children were rescued. The Gourock Times, dated 6 September 1940, reported the event under the headlines British Evacuee Ship Torpedoed, announced how cheerful the children had been and that their Ordeal Was a Great Adventure. While the children had been selected from all over the country, 74 were from Scotland. Some children were later sent overseas again a few weeks later on the ill-fated .

A curious fact only emerged long after the war (details revealed in a book published in 2014, Oceans Apart: Stories of Overseas Evacuees in World War Two, author Penny Starns). One child on board the Volendam, only referred to as Robert, a nine-year-old from Glasgow, was asleep throughout the ship's entire evacuation, and only appeared to the surprised skeleton crew on board, after the rest of the children and escorts had all been evacuated to life-boats. He was transferred to a destroyer, and on landing, he and his parents were sworn to secrecy.

The Volendam was taken in tow by the rescue tug  and beached on the Isle of Bute. Later she was refloated and repaired at a Clyde shipyard. When the damage was surveyed an unexploded second torpedo was found embedded in her bow. The U-boat had fired a spread of two torpedoes with a short interval; the detonation of the first may have blown off the warhead of the second torpedo.

The ship was converted to a troop transport and returned to service in July 1941. She was used to ferry troops to North Africa in 1942 and for the Allied invasion of Sicily in 1943, returning to North Africa with Italian and German prisoners. In 1944 she transported many US soldiers to northern France and continued until 1945. During this time she had carried over 100,000 troops.

Post-war
Volendam returned to Rotterdam in July 1945, she was partly reconditioned.  In August 1945, she carried British troops to Palestine – including the 3rd Battalion of Coldstream Guards.  The ship landed at Haifa.

In early 1946 she carried returning British service personnel (mostly ATS, WAAFs and married families) from Port Said to Glasgow, sailing on Feb 23, calling at Grand Harbour, Valletta on 26 Feb, Naples on 28 Feb and docking alongside King George V Dock late on March 7. Also carried Dutch troops that year to what was then the Dutch East Indies (now Indonesia). In 1947 she was used in the Australia emigrant service and in June 1948 made her first Rotterdam – Quebec sailing for the Netherlands government with capacity for 1,500 single class passengers. On Tuesday October 17, 1950 she departed Rotterdam for Sydney, arriving 6-weeks and 1 day later at her destination on Wednesday November 29, 1950. She brought with her a ship-load of (mainly Dutch) immigrants, all eager to forge new lives in Australia. In September 1948 she started her first Rotterdam – New York sailing and commenced her last voyage on this route in February 1951.

In October 1951 she made her last Rotterdam – Quebec – Rotterdam voyage and in 1952 was scrapped at Hendrik Ido Ambacht.

References

Sources
 STARNS, Penny, Oceans Apart: Stories of Overseas Evacuees in World War Two,(2014) History Press, 
BBC WW2 People's War 'fair dealing' terms:
Helen Cleary – An editor and writer who wrote non-fiction for the BBC History website. She was a member of the WW2 People's War Team from September 2003 until November 2004. Phil Edwards – A freelance writer and researcher specialising in 20th-century history. In 2003 he was doing research on post-war Italy at Salford University. Bruce Robinson – Graduated with a first class degree in History from Cambridge University. He was a regular contributor to the BBC History website and had written for various publications, as well as charities including Shelter and the NSPCC. Victoria Cook – Victoria was a Cambridge History graduate, and a freelance historical researcher. She had previously worked on two major exhibits at the Imperial War Museum, London, and the Churchill Museum in the Cabinet War Rooms.

 WW2 People’s War BBC Archive of memories contributed by the public, Newspaper Article about torpedoing of SS Volendam 
 WW2 People’s War BBC Archive of memories contributed by the public, ‘Het Verhaal Van De Purser’ (The Pursers Story)
 The Gourock Times, 6 September 1940

External links 
 Ships hit by U-boats: SS Volendam
 A trip aboard the Volendam, 1937, Youtube (in color)
 From Montreal to Rotterdam on SS Volendam, June 26 – July 7, 1951
 Holland America Line Archives of Historical Documents

1922 ships
Ships built in Govan
Passenger ships of the Netherlands
Ships of the Holland America Line
Ships built by Harland and Wolff
Steamships of the Netherlands
Maritime incidents in August 1940